The 1991–92 IHL season was the 47th season of the International Hockey League, a North American minor professional league. 10 teams participated in the regular season, and the Kansas City Blades won the Turner Cup.

Regular season

Turner Cup-Playoffs

External links
 Season 1991/92 on hockeydb.com

IHL
IHL
International Hockey League (1945–2001) seasons